Jefferson-Morgan Middle/Senior High School is a small, rural, public school in the Jefferson-Morgan School District. It is located in Jefferson, Pennsylvania, about 55 miles (90 km) south of Pittsburgh in northeastern Greene County. Enrollment was 320 students in grades 7–12 in the 2018–2019 school year.

Extracurriculars
Jefferson-Morgan School District offers a variety of clubs, activities and an extensive sports program.

Clubs and activities
The activities offered through the school include: SADD, Yearbook, National Honor Society, Drama Club, Student Council, Principal Advisory Council, Fiber Arts Club, Foreign Language Club, Varsity Club, Library Club, Big Brothers/Big Sisters, Debate Team, Academic Team, School Newspaper, Science Olympiad, Envirothon, and Youth Traffic Safety Council.

The Jefferson-Morgan middle/high school music program consists of a Concert Band, 2 choruses (one for students in Middle School and the other for students in Senior High), and the Jefferson-Morgan "Rocket" Marching Band. The marching band is made up of students in grade 7–12, and consists of Musicians, Band Front, and an Honor Guard. They perform throughout the year at school, community, and athletic events, most notably at all Rocket varsity home and away football games and various noncompetitive high school band festivals each fall. The music department also frequently goes on trips in the spring. The Band Boosters and Chorus Boosters are both active in helping out with travel and various performances, as well as providing t-shirts, letter jackets, snacks, and other items to the Marching Band each season.

Athletics
Jefferson-Morgan High School is a member of the Pennsylvania Interscholastic Athletic Association (PIAA) and the Western Pennsylvania Interscholastic Athletic League (WPIAL).  Jefferson-Morgan is in PIAA District 7. As of 2016, most of the high school's athletic teams compete in the Tri-County South conference of Class 1A, the smallest of 6 classifications, with the exception of the boys' basketball program, which is in 2A.

Middle School Sports
Jefferson-Morgan students in grades 7–8 can participate  in a select few athletics:
 basketball
 football
 softball
 volleyball
 wrestling

References

Public high schools in Pennsylvania
Public middle schools in Pennsylvania
Schools in Greene County, Pennsylvania